Stacey Lee Webber (born 1982) is an American metalsmith.

A native of Indianapolis, Webber lives and works in Philadelphia. A 2005 BFA graduate of Ball State University, she received her MFA from the University of Wisconsin - Madison in 2008. She is known for her sculptures and jewelry made out of reclaimed pennies, although she uses other coins in her work as well. Webber was among the artists featured in the exhibit "40 Under 40: Craft Futures" at the Renwick Gallery of the Smithsonian Museum of American Art, and one of her pieces was subsequently accessioned by the museum.
She received an American Craft Council Award of Excellence in both 2013 and 2015.

References

External links 
 Subversively Embroidered Money and Penny Sculptures Question Historical Narratives By Grace Ebert, Colossal
 

1982 births
Living people
21st-century American women artists
21st-century American artists
American metalsmiths
Women metalsmiths
Artists from Indianapolis
Artists from Philadelphia
Ball State University alumni
University of Wisconsin–Madison alumni